The president of the Senate of the Republic is the presiding officer of the Italian Senate. The President of the Senate is the second highest-ranking office of the Italian Republic (after the president of the Republic).

Since 13 October 2022, the role has been held by Ignazio La Russa.

Role 
The President of the Senate represents the Senate to external bodies, regulates debates in the Senate chamber by applying its regulations and the rules of the Italian Constitution, and regulates all the activities of its components in order to ensure that it functions correctly.

The President of the Senate, along with the President of the Chamber of Deputies, must be consulted by the President of the Republic before the latter can dissolve the Italian Parliament (Article 88).

Acting President of the Republic 

If the President of the Republic is unable to perform their role as head of state, then the President of the Senate takes on the role, under article 86 of the Italian Constitution. In this event, the honor guard of the President of the Republic, the Corazzieri, are transferred to the President of the Senate's residence, Palazzo Giustiniani, and a banner with the symbol of the Italian Republic is placed in the President's office.

While the President of the Senate is acting President of the Republic, the presidency of the Senate is exercised by a Vice President.

Election 
The President of the Senate is elected by the members of the Senate. This election is governed by the Senate's regulations, which require a simple majority of the votes of the members of the Senate. In case this does not result in election of a candidate after two rounds of voting, then the President can be elected by a simple majority of the voting members (i.e. excluding abstentions). If the Senate still fails to elect a President, then it holds a run-off vote between the two candidates who received the most votes in the preceding round of voting and award the presidency to whoever receives a plurality of the votes. If votes for the two candidates are tied, then the position is given to whichever candidate is older.

The election of the President of the Senate takes place at the first sitting of the Senate after an election, which must occur within twenty days of said election. Until the election is complete, the presidency is held by the oldest Senator.

See also 

 Italian Parliament
 Senate of the Republic (Italy)
 List of presidents of the Senate (Italy)
 President of the Chamber of Deputies (Italy)

References

External links 
 

 
Italian Parliament
Chairs of upper houses